Bloemfontein, also known as Bloem, is the capital and the largest city of the Free State province. It is often, and has been traditionally referred to as the country's "judicial capital", alongside the legislative capital Cape Town and administrative capital Pretoria, although the highest court in South Africa, the Constitutional Court has been in Johannesburg since 1994.

It was one of the host cities for the 2010 FIFA World Cup.

The city of Bloemfontein hosts the Supreme Court of Appeal, the Franklin Game Reserve, Naval Hill, the Maselspoort Resort and the Sand du Plessis Theatre. The city hosts numerous museums, including the National Women's Monument, the Anglo-Boer War Museum, the National Museum, and the Oliewenhuis Art Museum. Bloemfontein also hosts the first digital planetarium in the southern hemisphere, the Naval Hill Planetarium and Boyden Observatory, an astronomical research observatory.

Bloemfontein is popularly and poetically known as "the city of roses", for its abundance of these flowers and the annual rose festival held there.It is the largest city in the Free State province of South Africa.The city is situated in the middle of the country, hence it is referred to as 'Central South Africa'.
 The city's Sesotho name is Mangaung, meaning "place of cheetahs".

History

Early history
Though historically a !Orana settlement, and then a Boer settlement, Bloemfontein was officially founded in 1846 as a fort by British Army major Henry Douglas Warden as a British outpost in the Transoranje region, at that stage occupied by various groups of peoples including !Orana (so-called "Korana" of the ǀHõaǁʼaes, ǀHũdiǁʼaes, Einiǁʼaes and others), Cape Colony Trek Boers, Griqua (at that time known as Baasters), and Barolong.

Warden originally chose the site largely because of its proximity to the main route to Winburg, the spacious open country, and the absence of horse sickness. Bloemfontein was the original farm of Johannes Nicolaas Brits born 21 February 1790, owner and first inhabitant of Bloemfontein. Johann – as he was known – sold the farm to Major Warden.

With colonial policy shifts, the region changed into the Orange River Sovereignty (1848–1854) and eventually the Orange Free State Republic (1854–1902). From 1902 to 1910 it served as the capital of the Orange River Colony and since that time as the provincial capital of the Free State. In 1910 it became the Judicial capital of the Union of South Africa. A possible etymology for the city's name is that it is called Bloemfontein "Bloem's fountain", after Jan Bloem II, a Griqua leader.

Orange Free State (1854–1902)

The Orange Free State was an independent Boer Republic in southern Africa during the second half of the 19th century. Extending between the Orange and Vaal rivers, its borders were determined by the United Kingdom of Great Britain and Ireland in 1848 when the region was proclaimed as the Orange River Sovereignty, with a seat of a British Resident in Bloemfontein.

As the capital of the Orange Free State Republic the growth and maturing of the republic resulted in the growth of Bloemfontein. The city constructed numerous public buildings that remain in use today, facilitated by the governance of the republic and compensation from the British for the loss of the diamond rich Griqua Land area. The old Orange Free State's presidential residence the Old Presidency is currently a museum and cultural space in the city.

A railway line was built in 1890 connecting Bloemfontein to Cape Town. The railway line provided a centrally located railway station, and proved critical to the British in occupying the city later.

The writer J. R. R. Tolkien was born in the city on 3 January 1892, though his family left Orange Free State (now Free State province, South Africa) following the death of his father, Arthur Tolkien, when Tolkien was three (1895). He recorded that his earliest memories were of "a hot country".

In 1899 the city was the site of the Bloemfontein Conference, which failed to prevent the outbreak of the Second Boer War. The conference was a final attempt to avert a war between Britain and the South African Republic. With its failure the stage was set for war, which broke out on 11 October 1899.

On 13 March 1900, following the Battle of Paardeberg, the British captured the city and built a concentration camp nearby to house Boer women and children. In 1913, the National Women's Monument was constructed on the outskirts of the city to commemorate all Boer civilians which died in concentration camps during the war.

The hill in town was named Naval Hill after the naval guns brought in by the British in order to fortify the position against attack.

Unionisation of South Africa (1910s) 
On 31 May 1910, exactly eight years after the Boers signed the Peace Treaty of Vereeniging that ended the Anglo-Boer War between the British Empire and two Boer states, the South African Republic (Republic of Transvaal) and the Orange Free State, South Africa became a Union.

Due to disagreements over where the Union's capital should be, a compromise was reached that allowed Bloemfontein to host Appellate Division and become the Union's judicial capital. Bloemfontein was also given financial compensation.

On 8 January 1912, the South African Native National Congress (SANNC) was founded in Bloemfontein. The Union of South Africa had not granted rights to black South Africans, causing the organisation's creation. Its primary aim was to fight for the rights of black South Africans. During the implementation of pass laws, the city saw major demonstrations that forced South African authorities to exempt women from them for nearly four decades.

From 1 to 9 January 1914, James Barry Munnik Hertzog and his supporters met in Bloemfontein to form the National Party of the Orange Free State, and to lay down its principles, following Hertzog's exit from the South African Party in 1913. The National Party grew to govern South Africa in 1948 and implement the policy of racial segregation known as apartheid.

Apartheid era (1948–1994)

When the National Party won the 1948 South African national government elections they began implementing the policy known as apartheid. The policy was built on separate development of ethnic groups and racial segregation was implemented. In Bloemfontein, residential segregation had begun in the 19th century with the passing of Ordinance 1 of 1860, which determined that no non-white, without written permission from the landlord (British government), had the right to occupy urban land in towns where local municipalities did not yet exist. On 3 June 1861, the council demarcated three locations in the following areas; the black population was to move to the area which lay to the right of a neighbourhood that was known as Kaffirfontein, Coloureds were to move to the Waaihoek Black residential area on the eastern outskirts of the town. The inhabitants of these settlements had to pay the so-called hut tax as well as tax on grazing rights. This laid the foundation for the implementation of residential urban segregation as envisaged by the architects of apartheid.

When the South African apartheid government passed the Group Areas Act of 1950, the Bloemfontein municipality put into effect changes in the racial set-up of the city. The municipality demolished the Cape Stands residential area which was occupied by the city's coloured population and moved the residents to Heidedal. However, due to Coloureds living in such close proximity with black people, intermarriages across racial lines occurred, resulting in a partial mixed population in Heidedal and Mangaung. In 1952 the Bloemfontein municipality began building new residential areas for the city's black population. New residential areas to separate ethnic groups such as Sotho, Xhosa and Tswana were formed. The residential areas were jointly known as Mangaung.  Phahameng, a Sotho township, was the first formal housing projects to be approved by the municipality in 1956. Physical buffers such as the railway line and roads were put into place to separate black ethnic groups, the white and coloured population. 11,000 housing structures, of which approximately 6,000 were government built rental accommodation, were erected in Mangaung between 1952-1968.

In 1968, Mangaung faced serious housing shortages when as many as 3,000 to 6,000 housing units were needed. To counter this problem, a 55 km eastward expansion called Botshabelo was added in 1979. The Bloemfontein municipality channelled off all black urbanisation to Thaba Nchu and Botshabelo, which were developed as a source of cheap labour for the city of Bloemfontein. A subsidised bus service was established, and Botshabelo was declared a decentralisation point, meaning it was designated to become an industrial development point in order to reduce the distance between place of employment and place of residence.

In 1988, an approximate 14,500 people were commuting on a daily basis between Botshabelo and Bloemfontein. This meant that 55% of Botshabelo's work force was employed outside the city. In 1994, after the disestablishment of the apartheid government, Bloemfontein, Botshabelo, and Thaba Nchu became part of Motheo District Municipality. The Motheo District Municipality was disestablished on 18 May 2011 and Mangaung was upgraded to become an autonomous metropolitan municipality with Bloemfontein as the main seat.

Since 1994
Until 1994 the city was the sole judicial capital of South Africa. It remains the seat for the Supreme Court of Appeal (formerly the Appellate Division of the Supreme Court). It is also an administrative centre with many private hospitals and educational institutions.

Government
Free State Provincial Government building
Bloemfontein forms part of the Mangaung Metropolitan Municipality, which was upgraded from a Local Municipality in 2011.

The Mangaung Metropolitan Municipality elects a municipal council for five-year periods, through a mixed-member proportional representation (MMP) system in which wards elect individual councillors alongside those named from party lists. Voters get two votes: one for a representative to become a ward councillor and the other for a political party. The latter vote is used to distribute seats in the municipal council amongst parties while the former distributes seats through the individual representatives. The current Executive Mayor of Mangaung, Olly Mlamleli, was elected in August 2016.

Geography and climate

The area is generally flat with occasional hills (koppies in Afrikaans) and the general vegetation is Highveld grassland. Bloemfontein experiences a subtropical monsoon (Köppen cwa), with hot and wet summer days and cooler, dry winters, often with frosts. Snow is rare but as recently as August 2006 it snowed in the city, with snowfalls occurring again at the airport on 26 July 2007.

Suburbs

Bloemfontein suburbs include Heidedal to the east and southeast, Bain's Vlei, Woodland Hills Wildlife Estate, Brandwag, Ehrlich Park, Fauna, Fichardt Park, Fleurdal, Gardenia Park, Generaal De Wet, Hospitaalpark, Kiepersol, Lourier Park, Park West, Pellissier, Uitsig, Universitas, Westdene, Wilgehof and Willows to the south of the city. To the west of Bloemfontein, you will find Langenhoven Park. To the north you will find Arboretum, Baysvalley, Bayswater, Dan Pienaar, Helicon Heights, Heuwelsig, Hillsboro, Hillside, Hilton, Naval Hill, Navalsig, Noordhoek, Pentagon Park, Panorama Park, and Waverley. To the north east you will find Roodewal and Vallombrosa. The predominantly black suburbs are Rocklands, Phahameng, Phelindaba, Bloemanda, Bochabela, JB Mafora and the most historic Batho where the Maphikela House (where the African National Congress started) is situated. To the east of Bloemfontein, Botshabelo and Thaba 'Nchu townships are situated.

Sports

Stadium

The Free State Stadium and the surrounding sports complex is the main sports venue in the city and province. The venue was the hosting stadium of the 2010 FIFA World Cup South Africa matches played in Bloemfontein. There are several other sports venues in the city, however, including facilities belonging to the university, schools and sports clubs. Other stadiums in the city are Mangaung Oval, Dr. Petrus Molemela Stadium and Clive Solomons Stadium.

Football
Bloemfontein is joint home (together with nearby Botshabelo) to Premier Soccer League team Bloemfontein Celtic. Some of the matches of the 2010 FIFA World Cup were played at the Free State Stadium, including the historic 4–1 defeat of England by Germany in the round of 16

Rugby
Bloemfontein's Free State Stadium is home to two rugby union teams; the Cheetahs who compete in the Pro 14 and the Free State Cheetahs who play in the domestic Currie Cup. The Free State Cheetahs won the Currie Cup in 2005 against the Blue Bulls, they drew the final with the Blue Bulls in 2006 and retained the Currie Cup title in 2007 by beating the Golden Lions resulting in the Cheetahs remaining Currie Cup champions until 2008 when the failed to make the final for the first time since 2004. 2009 saw the Cheetahs return to the Currie Cup final but they were unable to beat the Blue Bulls at Loftus Versfeld. In 2016 the Cheetahs won the Currie Cup after a perfect season, beating the Blue Bulls at home in Bloemfontein.

Cricket
The Knights cricket team representing the Free State and Northern Cape in various series is located at Mangaung Oval, part of the Free State Stadium complex. Bloemfontein features as a regular venue for touring international and local cricket teams.

Soaring
The town has one of the most active soaring communities in South Africa and the world, using the New Tempe Airport, north of Bloemfontein.

Motor sports
Bloemfontein has a motocross track (tempe) run by the Bloemfontein Off Road Club, as well as a go-kart circuit (M&F Raceway), which was closed down in early 2015.

Shooting sports
Bloemfontein's shooting sport community has produced many provincial and national representatives over the years.

Metallic Silhouette Shooting 
Bloemfontein's Metallic Silhouette Shooting Range is one of the top metallic silhouette shooting ranges in the world. Three IMSSU international championships have been held here :

 2004 6th IMSSU World Championships
 2006 7th IMSSU World Championships
2016 12th IMSSU World Championships

Rock climbing
Bloemfontein has two rock climbing clubs, each with a wall and boulder cave.

Rose Festival
Every year Bloemfontein, the 'City of Roses', celebrates the 'Bloemfontein Rose Festival', known also as the 'Mangaung Rose Festival', in October—the cool month in which roses in the Free State bloom best. The majority of the events happen at the Loch Logan Waterfront in Bloemfontein. The festival attracts rose enthusiasts from all over South Africa and the world to participate in and experience this grand showcase of roses and other local events and attractions. The festival has made Bloemfontein a popular tourist destination with thousands of people attending the festival annually.

History of the Rose Festival
The first rose festival first took place in 1976, when council members decided that hosting such a festival was appropriate, given the area's name. In 1976 the events spanned over a few days and included activities related to roses in the Sanlam Plaza. Since then, the rose festival has expanded and grown to meet the needs and interests of the public.

Activities
Horticulturalists are invited to take part in competitions that focus on designing and improving unkempt gardens around the city. 
Festival activities take place in private gardens all over Bloemfontein, as local residents of the city open their gardens to the general public.

Loch Logan Waterfront
Most festival activities take place at the Loch Logan Waterfront, the largest shopping centre in central South Africa. It spans about 80 000 m2 of space and is the hub of shopping, entertainment, sport and culture in Bloemfontein. The waterfront displays flowers created by local nurseries as well as the official municipal display created by the parks department, which is organised by the Mangaung Municipality. The Free State Rose Society's champion Rose Cut Competition, with approximately 700 entrants every year, is also hosted at the Waterfront, along with the Miss Volksblad Rosebud competition for girls aged 3–4 years old, organised in conjunction with the Volksblad daily newspaper.

Rose Morning High Tea
The Rose Morning High Tea usually occurs at the Urth Garden Centre where tea and treats are served. The Urth Garden Centre is a retail and wholesale nursery that is located on Kenneth Kaunda Road in Bloemfontein. The crowning of the King and of Mangaung in the year of nomination.

Mangaung Rose Classic Cycle Tour
The Mangaung Rose Classic Cycle Tour is a road race that happens during the festival every year. The event is organised by AfriCycle Tours and the dates are announced annually. The race starts at the Urth and the race distances include 22 km, 56 km and 106 km.

Let's Green Bloem Expo
This expo forms part of the Mangaung/Bloemfontein Rose Festival and gives 'green' and organic local businesses an opportunity to promote their businesses. This includes showcasing different products and services that support a green environment, such as solar power, grey water systems, vegetable tunnels, JoJo tank systems, etc.

Basic education
Bloemfontein houses many institutions of learning, from pre-schools to universities and colleges. Classes are taught in different languages from school to school, with some schools even teaching all their classes in two languages. The languages are predominantly Afrikaans, English, and Sesotho.

Primary education
 St. Andrew's Primary School
 Grey College Primary School

Secondary education
 St. Andrew's School
 Grey College
 Eunice High School (Bloemfontein)
 Bloemfontein High School
 Hoërskool Fichardtpark
 Hoërskool Jim Fouché
 Hoërskool Sand du Plessis
 St. Michael's School
 Hoërskool Sentraal

Tertiary education

Public tertiary institutions
University of the Free State
Central University of Technology

There is a Further Education and Training College called Motheo FET College which comprises three main campuses (Thaba N'chu, Hillside view and Bloemfontein) and the satellite campuses in Zastron, Philippolis and Botshabelo.

Economy 
The private sector mainly drives Bloemfontein's economy. Bloemfontein’s share of National GDP, employment, and population is the lowest among the benchmark group of South African and Southern African cities, falling just below the city of Port Elizabeth. The city’s share of the National GDP is 1.73%, with a share of national employment at 1.86% and a share of the national population at 1.67%. Bloemfontein’s GDP growth, at 0.57% in 2015, stood in the lower half of the benchmark group of cities. Along with other major cities in South Africa, Bloemfontein’s GDP growth has slowly decreased in recent years.

Some of South Africa's largest retail companies have headquarters in the city.

Major companies 
The city is home to two of South Africa's top construction and infrastructure companies. Raubex Group Ltd, established in 1974 and listed on the JSE Limited since March 2007 and Ruwacon (Pty Ltd), established in 1999.

Other major companies included the retail department store, Kloppers, establishment in 1967 and EconoFoods (Pty Ltd) established in 1996.

Hospitals and clinics 

 Mediclinic Bloemfontein, the biggest hospital in the Mediclinic private hospital group opened its doors in July 1990. 
 Life Rosepark Hospital
 National District Hospital 
 Universitas Academic Hospital 
 Pelenomi Academic Hospital
 Busamed Bram Fischer Private Hospital
 EmoyaMed Private Hospital

Entertainment 
 Windmill Casino and Entertainment World
 Southern Sun Casino
 Andre Huguenot theatre
 Sand du Plessis Theatre

Queen of Roses also happens during this event. The competition recognizes citizens of the City of Bloemfontein for contributions that go beyond their normal duties to enrich the Mangaung Metro. Nominees need to be citizens.

Media
 Dumelang Media

Newspapers 

 Dumelang News - The People's Paper
 Free State Times
 Volksblad
 Ons Stad Closed down
 Bloemnuus
 The Weekly
 Courant

Radio

 OFM
 Kovsie FM
 Lesedi FM
 Motheo FM
 Radio Rosestad 100.6 FM
 Motsweding FM
 CUT FM
 Med FM

Transport

Road

Bloemfontein's national and regional roads are as follows: The N1, a major highway running roughly SE to NW from Cape Town to Johannesburg and Zimbabwe largely bypasses this city to the west. The N8 runs east/west connecting Bloemfontein to Kimberley and Maseru, the capital of Lesotho. Bloemfontein is also the northern end of the N6 road heading roughly southwards to the port of East London.

There are also two two-digit R routes: the R64, which is the old road to Kimberley, via Dealesville and Boshof. It ends at the N1. The R30 ends at the N1 north of the town. It is the road to Welkom.

Three other three-digit R routes have their origin in Bloemfontein. The R706 takes origin from the N8 in the city centre, and heads south-west towards Jagersfontein and Fauresmith. The R702 also originates from the N8 in the city centre, but heads south-east towards the towns of Dewetsdorp and Wepener. The third road, the R700, starts in the city centre from the N8 and heads north crossing the N1 towards Bultfontein.

Below that level, Bloemfontein has a number of metropolitan or M roads. These roads are numbered independently of M-roads in other South African cities.

Rail

Bloemfontein is well connected with rail. It is located on the most important rail junction between Johannesburg and Cape Town, with daily trains to Port Elizabeth, East London and Johannesburg.

Air
Bloemfontein has two airports New Tempe Aerodrome and Bram Fischer International Airport. New Tempe Aerodrome has no scheduled flights, it is used as a training facility for aviators and schools. Bram Fischer International Airport has scheduled flights to all South Africa's major cities.

Public transport 

In October 2016, the Mangaung Metropolitan and various taxi associations reached an agreement on the Integrated Public Transport system which is currently under construction. The project consist of two phases, the first phase will see the construction of bus ways along the Metropolitan. The second will be the building of depot and stations.

Notable people
Many famous people are associated with Bloemfontein; these include:

Rugby players

 François Steyn, rugby player
 Juan Smith, rugby player
 Os du Randt, rugby player
 Chris Dry, South Africa national rugby sevens team player
 Naka Drotské, rugby player
 Brendan Venter, rugby player
 Andre Joubert, rugby player
 Andre Venter, rugby player
 Ruben Kruger, rugby player
 Ollie Le Roux, rugby player
 Coenie Oosthuizen, rugby player
 Jannie de Beer, rugby player

Cricket players

 Allan Donald, South African cricketer
 Hansie Cronje, South African cricket captain
 Morne van Wyk, played for South Africa Proteas Cricket team
 Kepler Wessels, test cricketer with Australia and South Africa

Football players

 Willem Jackson played for Bloemfontein Celtic and South Africa national football team.
 Vuyo Mere plays for Moroka Swallows.
 Thabo Nthethe played for Bloemfontein Celtic, Mamelodi Sundowns, Chippa United and South Africa national football team.
 Thembinkosi Lorch plays for Orlando Pirates and South Africa national football team.
 Kgotso Moleko plays for Kaizer Chiefs.

Musicians

 Leon Schuster, filmmaker, comedian and musician, born and schooled in Bloemfontein
 Shaun Morgan and Dale Stewart, musicians and founding members of the band Seether
 Coenie de Villiers, Afrikaans musician and songwriter
 Brendan Peyper, Afrikaans musician and songwriter

Actors / Directors

 Leon Schuster, filmmaker, comedian and musician, born and schooled in Bloemfontein
 Tony Kgoroge, South African actor, performances in movies including Hotel Rwanda, Blood Diamond, Invictus, Lord of War and Skin

Other
 J. R. R. Tolkien CBE was born in Bloemfontein on 3 January 1892. Tolkien is famous for creating the Legendarium fantasy epics, The Hobbit, The Lord of the Rings and The Silmarillion. When aged 3, Tolkien left South Africa for England.
 Ryk Neethling, Olympic gold medalist swimmer
 Zola Budd, international long-distance athlete, born in the city and attended Sentraal High School
 Gerrit Badenhorst, a powerlifter and strongman competitor.
 Karla Pretorius, SPAR Proteas and international netball player, attended the University of the Free State
 Frans Claerhout, artist
 Gert Coetzer, rugby league footballer who played in the 1960s
 Beric John Croome, Advocate of the High Court of South Africa
 Winkie Direko, first black chancellor of the University of the Free State
 Lizzie van Zyl, Child inmate of the Bloemfontein concentration camp during the Second Boer War
 Dr John Vernon Harrison FRSE geologist, was born here
Flaxman Qoopane, writer
Billy Modise
Elzabe Rockman, former Free State MEC for Finance

Religion
Bloemfontein has a large and diverse Christian population. The city houses several churches and denominations:

 It is the seat of the Anglican Diocese of the Free State
 Afrikaans Baptist Church (Afrikaans: Afrikaanse Baptiste Kerk)
 Dutch Reformed Church (Afrikaans: Nederduitse Gereformeerde Kerk)
 Sacred Heart Cathedral in Bloemfontein is the seat of the Roman Catholic Archdiocese of Bloemfontein
 Seventh-day Adventist Church, Southern African headquarters.
 Christian Revival Church, is the largest church in Bloemfontein with over 30,000 members. CRC's net is widely cast and is established in Bloemfontein, Pretoria and Johannesburg along with 90 national and international CRC Churches worldwide, executing the mission of "One Church, Many Locations" throughout South Africa, Europe, America & Australia. The church is led by Pastor At Boshoff, together with his wife Nyretta.
 New Covenant Ministries International had a church called Fountainhead led by Chris Gerber. It was a New Testament Church known by the name Fountainhead Church International. Later this church merged with Doxa Deo Bloemfontein, which is now the name of the combined church.

The city also has a large Jewish population, which was established during the mid-19th century.

There are two main cemeteries in Bloemfontein:
 The Old Cemetery: Over 1,000 names from the three cemeteries. Old: The oldest of the three cemeteries, dating from 1871, is simply a small fenced off area of a public cemetery near the city centre. It includes a few graves of several Jewish pioneers involved in the early days of the city who died serving on either side in the Boer War, 1899–1902. Each of the thirty or so tombstones of these pioneer families has been completely transcribed.
 South Park: This cemetery was consecrated in 1978 and now includes more than 10 000 graves and is the biggest cemetery in the Free State.

On 7 October 2010, Several tombstones in the Jewish cemetery in Bloemfontein were defaced with swastikas and antisemitic graffiti.
On 10 April 2012, Bloemfontein's historic Memorium cemetery was vandalized, with 35 tombstones toppled and obscene graffiti daubed on the walls of the adjoining Ohel. The graffiti included images of money bags and diamonds, as well as of a crudely drawn Magen David, allegedly as part of an anti-Semitic act.
There is also the old Phahameng cemetery which dates back to the 1960s and was specifically reserved for Africans during the apartheid era and has a Heroes Acre, where freedom fighters are laid to rest.
The Heide Heights cemetery in Heidedal was reserved for coloured people during the apartheid era but all races could bury their dead after 1994. This cemetery has been closed due to it being full.

Community service organisations
 Round Table 158 Bloemfontein The first Round Table was formed in Norwich, England in 1927. The founder, Louis Marchesi, was a young member of Norwich Rotary Club who felt a need existed for a club where the young business men of the town could gather on a regular basis. At their meetings they could exchange ideas, learn from the experiences of their colleagues and play a collective part in the civic life of Norwich. From a very early stage it was agreed that Round Table would be a non-religious, non-political club and this has continued to this day.
 Child Welfare Bloemfontein Child Welfare Bloemfontein & Childline Free State is a non-profit organisation that was founded in 1914 by a group of volunteers who identified a need for welfare services among the community. In 2004, Child Welfare Bloemfontein celebrated its 90th birthday. Over the past 90 years, many community programmes have been successfully implemented.
 FreeMasons The Masonic Centre, Bloemfontein, was built during the 1970s when all the Masonic Lodges in Bloemfontein, sold their individual properties. The centre was erected to facilitate all Masonic activities in Bloemfontein and surrounding areas. All four Constitutions that is active in South Africa, gather at the centre. The Lodges that has ownership of the centre is Lodge Unie (est. 1864); the Rising Star Lodge (est. 1865); Thistle Lodge (est.1903); Emerald Lodge (est. 1905); Lodge Dagbreek (est. 1932) & Lodge Oranje (est. 1964). Various side degrees are catered for at the Centre which includes the Mark, Ark, the Royal Arch & Rose Croix. Bloemfontein has a rich Masonic history especially in the Anglo Boer War (1899–1902), with members such as Lord Kitchener, Rudyard Kipling and Sir Arthur Conan Doyle, visiting Lodges in Bloemfontein.

International relations

Sister cities

  Nanjing, China
  Bhubaneshwar, India

References

External links

 Bloemfontein The official Mangaung Local Municipality website
 
 Apartheid and housing in Mangaung and Botshabelo 

 
Populated places in Mangaung
Cities in South Africa
Provincial capitals in South Africa
Capitals in Africa
Populated places established in 1846
Bloemfontein
Second Boer War concentration camps
1846 establishments in Africa